The Chatham Islands (Moriori: Rēkohu,  'Misty Sun') are an archipelago in the Pacific Ocean about  east of New Zealand's South Island. They are administered as part of New Zealand. The archipelago consists of about 10 islands within an approximate  radius, the largest of which are Chatham Island and Pitt Island (Rangiauria). They include New Zealand's easternmost point, the Forty-Fours. Some of the islands, formerly cleared for farming, are now preserved as nature reserves to conserve some of the unique flora and fauna.

The islands were uninhabited when the Moriori people arrived around 1500 CE and developed a peaceful way of life. In 1835 members of the Ngāti Mutunga and Ngāti Tama Māori iwi from the North Island of New Zealand invaded the islands and nearly exterminated the Moriori, enslaving the survivors. Later during the period of European colonisation of New Zealand, the New Zealand Company claimed that the British Crown had never included the Chatham Islands as being under its control. The company proposed that it should be sold to the Germans to be a German colony with a contract drawn up for the sale of the islands of £10,000 in 1841. However, the sale failed and the Chatham Islands officially became part of the Colony of New Zealand in 1842. In 1863 the resident magistrate declared the Moriori released from slavery.

The Chatham Islands had a resident population of  Waitangi is the main port and settlement. The local economy depends largely on conservation, tourism, farming, and fishing. The Chatham Islands Council provides local administration – its powers resemble those of New Zealand's unitary authorities. The Chatham Islands have their own time zone, 45 minutes ahead of the rest of New Zealand.

Geography

The nearest New Zealand 
mainland point to the Chatham Islands, Cape Turnagain in North Island, is  distant.

The Chatham Islands, which emerged only within the last 4 million years, are the only part of the Chatham Rise showing above sea level.

The islands are hilly, with coastal areas including cliffs, dunes, beaches, and lagoons. Notable are the large Te Whanga Lagoon, and Huro and Rangitahi. Chatham has a number of streams, including Te Awainanga and Tuku.

Chatham and Pitt are the only inhabited islands; the remaining smaller islands function as conservation reserves with restricted or prohibited access. The livelihoods of the inhabitants depend on agriculture - the islands export coldwater crayfish - and, increasingly, on tourism.

The names of the main islands, in the order of occupation are:

Geology 

The Chatham Islands – the only part of the Chatham Rise above sea level – form part of the now largely submerged continent of Zealandia. This location positions the Chatham Islands far from the Australian-Pacific plate boundary that dominates the geology of mainland New Zealand. The islands' stratigraphy consists of a Mesozoic schist basement, typically covered by marine sedimentary rocks. Both these sequences are intruded by a series of basalt eruptions. Volcanic activity has occurred multiple times since the Cretaceous, but currently there is no active volcanism near any part of the Chatham Rise.

Climate
The Chatham Islands have an oceanic climate (Koppen: Cfb) characterised by a narrow temperature range and relatively frequent rainfall. Their isolated position far from any sizeable landmass renders the record high temperature for the main settlement (Waitangi) just . Snow falls extremely rarely, the fall recorded near sea level in July 2015 marked the first such reading for several decades. Under the Trewartha climate classification, the Chatham Islands have a humid subtropical climate (Cf) for the lack of cold weather during the winter and a daily mean temperature above  for 8 months or more.

The Chatham Islands' time zone
The International Date Line lies to the east of the Chathams, even though the islands lie east of 180° longitude. The Chathams observe their own time, 45 minutes ahead of New Zealand time, including during periods of daylight-saving time; the Chatham Standard Time Zone is distinctive as one of very few that differ from others by a period other than a whole hour or half-hour. (New Zealand Time orients itself to 180° longitude.)

Ecology

The natural vegetation of the islands was a mixture of forest, scrubby heath, and swamp, but today most of the land is fern or pasture-covered, although there are some areas of dense forest and areas of peat bogs and other habitats. Of interest are the akeake trees, with branches trailing almost horizontally in the lee of the wind. The ferns in the forest understory include Blechnum discolor.

The islands are home to a rich bio-diversity including about 50 endemic plants adapted to the cold and the wind, such as the Chatham Islands forget-me-not (Myosotidium hortensia), the Chatham Islands sow-thistle (Embergeria grandifolia), rautini (Brachyglottis huntii), the Chatham Islands kakaha (Astelia chathamica), soft speargrass (Aciphylla dieffenbachii), and the Chatham Island akeake or Chatham Island tree daisy (Olearia traversiorum).

The islands are a breeding ground for huge flocks of seabirds and are home to a number of endemic birds, some of which are seabirds and others which live on the islands. The best known species are the magenta petrel (IUCN classification CR) and the black robin (IUCN classification EN), both of which came perilously close to extinction before drawing the attention of conservation efforts. Other endemic species are the Chatham oystercatcher, the Chatham gerygone, the Chatham pigeon, Forbes' parakeet, the Chatham snipe and the shore plover. The endemic Chatham shag (IUCN classification CR), the Pitt shag (IUCN classification EN) and the Chatham albatross (IUCN classification VU) are at risk of capture by a variety of fishing gear, including fishing lines, trawls, gillnets, and pots.

A number of species have gone extinct since human settlement, including the Chatham raven, the Chatham fernbird and the three endemic species of flightless rails, the Chatham rail, Dieffenbach's rail, and Hawkins's rail.

Also, a number of marine mammals are found in the waters of the Chathams, including New Zealand sea lions, leopard seals, and southern elephant seals. Many whale species are attracted to the rich food sources of the Chatham Rise.

Much of the natural forest of these islands has been cleared for farming, but Mangere and Rangatira Islands are now preserved as nature reserves to conserve some of these unique flora and fauna. Another threat to wildlife comes from introduced species which prey on the indigenous birds and reptiles, whereas on Mangere and Rangatira, livestock has been removed and native wildlife is recovering.

Most lakes have been affected by agricultural run-off, but water quality has improved and river quality is generally classed as 'A'.

History

Moriori

The first human inhabitants of the Chathams were Polynesian tribes who probably settled the islands around 1500 CE (though possibly as late as 1550 CE), and in their isolation became the Moriori. It was formerly believed that the Moriori migrated directly from the more northerly Polynesian islands. However, linguistic research in the early 2000s instead concluded that the ancestral Moriori were Māori wanderers from New Zealand:
Scholarship over the past 40 years has radically revised the model offered a century earlier by Smith: the Moriori as a pre-Polynesian people have gone (the term Moriori is now a technical term referring to those ancestral Māori who settled the Chatham Islands).'

The plants cultivated by the Māori arrivals were ill-suited for the colder Chathams, so the Moriori lived as hunter-gatherers and fishermen. While their new environment deprived them of the resources with which to build ocean-going craft for long voyages, the Moriori invented what was known as the waka kōrari, a semi-submerged craft, constructed of flax and lined with air bladders from kelp. This craft was used to travel to the outer islands on 'birding' missions. The Moriori society was a peaceful society and bloodshed was outlawed by the chief Nunuku-whenua after generations of warfare. Arguments were solved by consensus or by duels rather than warfare, but at the first sign of bloodshed, the fight was over. It has been estimated that the population numbered about 2,000 prior to European contact.

European arrival

The name "Chatham Islands" comes from William Pitt, 1st Earl of Chatham. The ship  of the Vancouver Expedition, whose captain was William R. Broughton, landed on the Island on 29 November 1791, claimed possession for Great Britain and named the islands after the First Lord of the Admiralty, John Pitt, 2nd Earl of Chatham. Broughton's men shot and killed a Moriori resident of Kaingaroa, named Torotoro (or Tamakororo). Chatham Islands date their anniversary on 29 November, and observe it on the nearest Monday to 30 November.

Sealers and whalers soon started hunting in the surrounding ocean with the islands as their base. It is estimated that 10 to 20 percent of the indigenous Moriori soon died from diseases introduced by foreigners. The sealing and whaling industries ceased activities about 1861, while fishing remained as a major economic activity.

An all-male group of German Moravian missionaries arrived in 1843. When a group of women were sent out to join them three years later, several marriages ensued; a few members of the present-day population can trace their ancestry back to those missionary families.

Māori settlement
On 19 November and 5 December 1835, about 900 Ngāti Mutunga and Ngāti Tama previously resident in Te Whanganui-A-Tara (Wellington) and led by the chief Pōmare Ngātata arrived on the brig Lord Rodney. The first mate of the ship had been 'kidnapped and threatened with death' unless the captain took the Māori settlers on board. The group, which included men, women and children, brought with them 78 tonnes of seed potato, 20 pigs and seven large waka.

The incoming Māori were received and initially cared for by the local Moriori. Soon, Ngāti Mutunga and Ngāti Tama began to takahi, or walk the land, to lay claim to it. When it became clear that the visitors intended to stay, the Moriori withdrew to their marae at te Awapatiki. There, after holding a hui (consultation) to debate what to do about the Māori settlers, the Moriori decided to keep with their policy of non-aggression.

Ngāti Mutunga and Ngāti Tama in turn saw the meeting as a precursor to warfare on the part of Moriori and responded. The Māori attacked and in the ensuing action killed over 260 Moriori. A Moriori survivor recalled: "[The Māori] commenced to kill us like sheep... [We] were terrified, fled to the bush, concealed ourselves in holes underground, and in any place to escape our enemies. It was of no avail; we were discovered and killed – men, women and children – indiscriminately". A Māori chief, Te Rakatau Katihe, said in the Native Land Court in 1870: "We took possession ... in accordance with our custom, and we caught all the people. Not one escaped. Some ran away from us, these we killed; and others also we killed – but what of that? It was in accordance with our custom. I am not aware of any of our people being killed by them."

After the killings, Moriori were forbidden to marry Moriori, or to have children with each other. Māori kept Moriori slaves until 1863, when slavery was abolished by proclamation of the resident magistrate. Many Moriori women had children by their Māori masters. A number of Moriori women eventually married either Māori or European men. Some were taken away from the Chathams and never returned. Ernst Dieffenbach, who visited the Chathams on a New Zealand Company ship in 1840, reported that the Moriori were the virtual slaves of Māori and were severely mistreated, with death being a blessing. By the time the slaves were released in 1863, only 160 remained, hardly 10% of the 1835 population.

In early May 1838 (some reports say 1839, but this is contradicted by ship records) the French whaling vessel Jean Bart anchored off Waitangi to trade with the Māori. The number of Māori boarding frightened the French, escalating into a confrontation in which the French crew were killed and the Jean Bart was run aground at Ocean Bay, to be ransacked and burned by Ngāti Mutunga. When word of the incident reached the French naval corvette Heroine in the Bay of Islands in September 1838, it set sail for the Chathams, accompanied by the whalers Adele and Rebecca Sims. The French arrived on 13 October and, after unsuccessfully attempting to entice some Ngāti Tama aboard, proceeded to bombard Waitangi. The next morning about a hundred armed Frenchmen went ashore, burning buildings, destroying waka, and seizing pigs and potatoes. The attacks mostly affected Ngāti Tama, weakening their position relative to Ngāti Mutunga.

In 1840, Ngāti Mutunga decided to attack Ngāti Tama at their . They built a high staging next to the pā so they could fire down on their former allies. Fighting was still in progress when the New Zealand Company ship Cuba arrived as part of a scheme to buy land for settlement. The Treaty of Waitangi, at that stage, did not apply to the islands. The company negotiated a truce between the two warring tribes. In 1841, the New Zealand Company had proposed to establish a German colony on the Chathams. The proposal was discussed by the directors, and the secretary of the company John Ward signed an agreement with Karl Sieveking of Hamburg on 12 September 1841. The price was set at £10,000. However, when the Colonial Office stated that the islands were to be part of the Colony of New Zealand and any Germans settling there would be treated as aliens, Joseph Somes claimed that Ward had been acting on his own initiative. The proposed leader John Beit and the expedition went to Nelson instead.

The company was then able to purchase large areas of land at Port Hutt (which the Māori called Whangaroa) and Waitangi from Ngāti Mutunga and also large areas of land from Ngāti Tama. This did not stop Ngāti Mutunga from trying to get revenge for the death of one of their chiefs. They were satisfied after they killed the brother of a Ngāti Tama chief. The tribes agreed to an uneasy peace which was finally confirmed in 1842.

Reluctant to give up slavery, Matioro and his people chartered a brig in late 1842 and sailed to Auckland Island. While Matioro was surveying the island, two of the chiefs who had accompanied him decided the island was too inhospitable for settlement, and set sail before he had returned, stranding him and his followers until Pākehā settlers arrived in 1849.

In 1865, the Māori leader Te Kooti was exiled on the Chatham Islands along with a large group of Māori rebels called the Hauhau, followers of Pai Mārire who had murdered missionaries and fought against government forces mainly on the East Coast of the North Island of New Zealand. The rebel prisoners were paid one shilling a day to work on sheep farms owned by the few European settlers. Sometimes they worked on road and track improvements. They were initially guarded by 26 guards, half of whom were Māori. They lived in whare along with their families. The prisoners helped build a redoubt of stone surrounded by a ditch and wall. Later, they built three stone prison cells. In 1868 Te Kooti and the other prisoners commandeered a schooner and escaped back to the North Island.

Almost all the Māori returned to Taranaki in the 1860s, some after a tsunami in 1868.

1880s to today 
The economy of the Chatham Islands, then dominated by the export of wool, suffered under the international depression of the 1880s, only rebounding with the building of fish freezing plants at the island villages of Ōwenga and Kaingaroa in 1910. Construction of the first wharf at Waitangi began in 1931 with completion in 1934. On 25 November 1940, during the Second World War, a German raider captured and then sank the Chatham Islands supply ship, the Holmwood, so the wharf saw little use by ships. A flying-boat facility was built soon after at Te Whanga Lagoon and a flying boat service continued till 1966 when it was replaced with conventional aircraft.

After the Second World War, the island economy suffered again from its isolation and government subsidies became necessary. This led to many young Chatham Islanders leaving for the mainland. There was a brief crayfish boom which helped stabilize the economy in the late 1960s and early 1970s. From the early 2000s cattle became a major component of the local economy.

Moriori community 
The Moriori community is organised as the Hokotehi Moriori Trust. The Moriori have received recognition from the Crown and the New Zealand government and some of their claims against those institutions for the generations of neglect and oppression have been accepted and acted on. Moriori are recognised as the original people of Rekohu. The Crown also recognised the Ngāti Mutunga Māori as having indigenous status in the Chathams by right of around 160 years of occupation.

The population of the islands is around 600, including members of both ethnic groups. In January 2005, the Moriori celebrated the opening of the new Kopinga Marae (meeting house).

Modern descendants of the 1835 Māori conquerors claimed a share in ancestral Māori fishing rights. This claim was granted. Now that the primordial population, the Moriori, have been recognised to be former Māori—over the objections of some of the Ngāti Mutunga—they too share in the ancestral Māori fishing rights. Both groups have been granted fishing quotas.

Population

Chatham and Pitt Islands are inhabited and had a population of 663 at the 2018 New Zealand census, an increase of 63 people (10.5%) since the 2013 census, and an increase of 51 people (8.3%) since the 2006 census. There were 276 households. There were 354 males and 312 females, giving a sex ratio of 1.13 males per female. The median age was 41.9 years (compared with 37.4 years nationally), with 111 people (16.7%) aged under 15 years, 129 (19.5%) aged 15 to 29, 339 (51.1%) aged 30 to 64, and 84 (12.7%) aged 65 or older.

Ethnicities were 74.2% European/Pākehā, 66.1% Māori, 1.4% Pacific peoples, 0.9% Asian, and 2.7% other ethnicities. People may identify with more than one ethnicity.

The percentage of people born overseas was 5.9, compared with 27.1% nationally.

Although some people objected to giving their religion, 48.4% had no religion, 33.5% were Christian and 7.7% had other religions.

Of those at least 15 years old, 51 (9.2%) people had a bachelor or higher degree, and 147 (26.6%) people had no formal qualifications. The median income was $36,000, compared with $31,800 nationally. 108 people (19.6%) earned over $70,000 compared to 17.2% nationally. The employment status of those at least 15 was that 318 (57.6%) people were employed full-time, 108 (19.6%) were part-time, and 9 (1.6%) were unemployed.

The town of Waitangi is the main settlement with 177 residents in the 2018 Census. There are other villages such as Owenga, Te One, and Kaingaroa, where there are two primary schools. A third school is on Pitt Island. There are also the fishing villages of Owenga and Port Hutt.

Waitangi facilities include a hospital with resident doctor, bank, several stores, and engineering and marine services. The main shipping wharf is located here.

Transport

Visitors to the Chathams usually arrive by air from Auckland, Christchurch or Wellington (around 2 hours from Christchurch on a ATR 72-500) to Tuuta Airport on Chatham Island. While freight generally arrives by ship (2 days sailing time), the sea journey takes too long for many passengers, and is not always available.

There is no scheduled public transport but accommodation providers are normally able to arrange transport.

Tasman Empire Airways Ltd (TEAL) initially serviced the Chathams by air using flying boats. With the withdrawal of TEAL, the RNZAF maintained an infrequent service with Short Sunderland flying boats. NZ4111 was damaged on takeoff from Te Whanga Lagoon on 4 November 1959 and remains as a wreck on the island. The last flight by RNZAF flying boats was on 22 March 1967. For many years Bristol Freighter aircraft served the islands, a slow and noisy freight aircraft converted for carrying passengers by installing a removable passenger compartment equipped with airline seats and a toilet in part of the cargo hold. The air service primarily served to ship out high-value export crayfish products.

The grass landing field at Hapupu, at the northern end of the Island, proved a limiting factor, as few aircraft apart from the Bristol Freighter had both the range to fly to the islands and the ruggedness to land on the grass airstrip. Although other aircraft did use the landing field occasionally, they would often require repairs to fix damage resulting from the rough landing. Hapupu is also the site of the JM Barker (Hapupu) National Historic Reserve (one of only two in New Zealand) where there are momori rakau (Moriori tree carvings).

In 1981, after many years of requests by locals and the imminent demise of the ageing Bristol Freighters, the construction of a sealed runway at Karewa, Tuuta Airport, allowed more modern aircraft to land safely. The Chathams' own airline, Air Chathams, now operates services to Auckland on Thursdays, Wellington on Mondays, Wednesdays and Fridays and Christchurch on Tuesdays. The timetable varies seasonally, but generally planes depart the Chathams around 10.30 am (Chathams Time) and arrive in the mainland around noon. There they refuel and reload, and depart again at around 1 pm back to the Chathams. Air Chathams operates twin turboprop ATR 72-500 aircraft (freight and passenger) and Fairchild Metroliners.

The ship Rangatira provided a freight service from Timaru to the Chatham Islands from March 2000 to August 2015. The MV Southern Tiare provides a freight service between Napier, Timaru and the Chathams.

There is a small section of tar sealed road between Waitangi and Te One, but the majority of the islands' roads are gravel.

Government

Electorates
The Chatham Islands are within a single electorate which sends one member to Parliament. Until the 1990s, the Chatham Islands were in the Lyttelton electorate, but since then they have formed part of the Rongotai general electorate, which otherwise lies in south Wellington. Paul Eagle is the MP for Rongotai. The Te Tai Tonga Māori electorate (held since 2011 by Rino Tirikatene) includes the Chatham Islands; before the seats were reformed in 1996 the archipelago was part of Western Maori.

Local government
For local government purposes, the Chatham Islands and the adjoining sea is known as the Chatham Islands Territory and is administered by the Chatham Islands Council, which was established by the Chatham Islands Council Act 1995 (Statute No 041, Commenced: 1 November 1995). These succeeded, respectively, the Chatham Islands County, which was established in 1901, and the Chatham Islands County Council, which was established in 1926. The Council is a territorial authority that has many of the functions, duties and powers of a district council and of a regional council, making it in effect a unitary authority with slightly fewer responsibilities than other unitary authorities. The Council comprises a directly-elected mayor and eight councillors, one of whom is also deputy mayor. Certain regional council functions are being administered by Environment Canterbury, the Canterbury Regional Council.

In the 2010 local government elections, Chatham Islands had New Zealand's highest rate of returned votes, with 71.3 per cent voting.

State services
Policing is carried out by a sole-charge constable appointed by the Wellington police district, who has often doubled as an official for many government departments, including court registrar (Department for Courts), customs officer (New Zealand Customs Service) and immigration officer (Department of Labour – New Zealand Immigration Service).

A District Court judge sent from either the North Island or the South Island presides over court sittings, but urgent sittings may take place at the Wellington District Court.

Because of the isolation and small population, some of the rules governing daily activities undergo a certain relaxation. For example, every transport service operated solely on Great Barrier Island, the Chatham Islands or Stewart Island / Rakiura need not comply with section 70C of the Transport Act 1962 (the requirements for drivers to maintain driving-hours logbooks). Drivers subject to section 70B must nevertheless keep record of their driving hours in some form.

Health
The Canterbury District Health Board is responsible for providing publicly funded health services for the island. Prior to July 2015, this was the responsibility of the Hawke's Bay District Health Board.

Education

There are three schools on the Chathams, at Kaingaroa, Te One, and Pitt Island. Pitt Island and Kaingaroa are staffed by sole charge principals, while Te One has three teachers and a principal. The schools cater for children from year 1 to 8. There is no secondary school. The majority of secondary school-aged students leave the island for boarding schools in mainland New Zealand. A small number remain on the island and obtain their secondary education by correspondence.

Economy 
Most of the Chatham Island economy is based on fishing and crayfishing, with only a fragment of the economic activity in adventure tourism. This economic mix has been stable for the past 50 years, as little infrastructure or population is present to engage in higher levels of industrial or telecommunications activity.

Air Chathams has its head office in Te One.

Electricity generation
Two 225 kW wind turbines and diesel generators provide power on Chatham Island, at costs of five to ten times that of electricity on the main islands of New Zealand. During 2014, 65% of the electricity was generated from diesel generators, the balance from wind. For heating, electricity comes second to wood and, in 2013, solar power contributed about a third as much as mains-generated electricity.

Telecommunications 
A 1.5 kW wireless link opened in 1913, a public radio link to the mainland was built in 1953 and an island phone system in 1965. In 2003 a digital microwave system was installed for 110 phones in Ōwenga.

The islands were linked as part of the Rural Broadband Initiative in 2014, when satellite bandwidth was increased, and broadband is now provided by Wireless Nation, though Farmside provide some coverage.

As late as 2019 there was no mobile phone coverage on the islands, however in December 2021, five 4G cellular towers were turned on to enable mobile phone coverage on Chatham and Pitt Island and deliver faster broadband. The main tower is positioned on Target Hill, which transmits to the other four towers through a microwave radio link; it is backhauled by Eutelsat 172B to a network in Wellington. The upgraded network delivers greater bandwidth than the previous link, and provides reliable broadband.

Notable people
 

Richard Charteris (musicologist) (b. 1948), New Zealand musicologist
Te Kiato Riwai (1912–1967), New Zealand nurse and Māori welfare officer

See also

Chatham Islands penguin
Flora of the Chatham Islands
History of Chatham Islands numismatics
List of islands of New Zealand
List of massacres in New Zealand
Moriori genocide

References

Bibliography
Clark, Ross. 1994. Moriori and Māori: The Linguistic Evidence. In Sutton, Douglas G., ed., The Origins of the First New Zealanders. Auckland: Auckland University Press.
Davis, Denise and Solomon, Māui. 2006. Moriori. In Te Ara – the Encyclopedia of New Zealand, updated 9 June 2006.

Howe, Kerry R. 2006. Ideas of Māori origins. In Te Ara – the Encyclopedia of New Zealand, updated 9 June 2006.

Waitangi Tribunal. 2001. Rekohu: A Report on Moriori and Ngati Mutunga Claims in the Chatham Islands. Report No. 64.

Films
The Wizard and the Commodore (2017) directed by Samuel A. Miller, Narrator Davey Round.

Further reading

External links

Chatham Islands Council
1998 Information
Photographs from the Christchurch Public Library
Department of Conservation information
Unofficial Flag
Massey University study of Chathams ecology
Information and pictures of Chatham Islands. The Sisters are also mentioned
Pitt Island Education Resources.
Rekohu: The Chatham Islands Education Resources.

 
Temperate broadleaf and mixed forests
Ecoregions of New Zealand
Zealandia
Archipelagoes of New Zealand
Archipelagoes of the Pacific Ocean
Temperate Australasia
Endemic Bird Areas